Livin' with Lucy is an Irish television programme presented by Lucy Kennedy. First aired on 14 April 2008, the premise of the show is that Kennedy spends a weekend living with a different celebrity each episode, analysing their daily lives and interviewing them in their own homes all the while with cameras filming in the background. The show aired originally on RTÉ Two on Monday nights at 21:30. The programme has proven controversial, with Kennedy being stalked by paparazzi and some of the celebrities airing slanderous views.

Series two began on 20 October 2008. Series three began to air on RTÉ Two on Thursday 11 November 2010 and ended on 16 December 2010.

Episodes on RTÉ

Series 1
Series one began on 14 April 2008. During filming of the show Kennedy was hunted by the paparazzi and subjected to vicious photography and googling when she stayed with British tabloid fodder Jade Goody. She encountered controversy whilst staying with Samantha Mumba when the singer launched a verbal attack on Irish radio presenter Dave Fanning, calling him a number of unprintable expletives. David Norris was said to have commented: "I tire out people half my age. I had Lucy Kennedy staying with me for her Livin' with Lucy series and she had to go to bed for a week afterwards."

Series 2
Series two began on 20 October 2008. In the first episode presenter Lucy Kennedy spent three days with Shane Lynch in his caravan in Surrey. Don Baker enticed Kennedy into his jacuzzi and she also joined him on stage to play the tambourine.

Series 3
Series three began on 11 November 2010 and ended on 16 December 2010.

Episodes on TV3/Virgin Media

Series 1
In August 2016 TV3 (Ireland) announced they had taken over the rights of the show and changed to Living with Lucy. Shane Long, Kerry Katona and Jedward were among the celebrities appearing in the series.

Series 2

Series 3
In September 2018 Virgin Media One, the new name for TV3 broadcast this series.

Series 4

Lodging with Lucy

Due to the COVID-19 pandemic and various lockdown rules, Lucy Kennedy hosted a variation of the show, Lodging with Lucy, in which guests came to stay with her in a hired lodge in Meath, Ireland.

Series 5

Reception
The Irish Independent claimed self-regard was Kennedy's "most striking trait" and derided her obsession with bodily functions ("poo" and "willies" are frequently mentioned). When Calum Best announced his reasons for taking part (he wanted to "tell the Irish people what's going on -- if they watch this shit show."), the newspaper suggested they give him a job as a critic. It was later named by the Irish Independent as one of its six worst television programmes of 2008.

See also
Stacey Dooley Sleeps Over

References

2008 Irish television series debuts
Irish reality television series
RTÉ original programming